Hsieh Chen-wu (born 21 October 1963) is a Taiwanese lawyer and TV presenter. He worked for many television stations, such as TTV, CTS, FTV, PTV, SET, STAR Chinese Channel, CTi Variety, Much TV and Momo TV. He is most famous for hosting the Chao ji da fu weng game show.

References 

1963 births
Living people
Who Wants to Be a Millionaire?
Taiwanese television personalities
20th-century Taiwanese lawyers
People from Keelung